Ferdinand Cheval (19 April 1836 – 19 August 1924), often nicknamed Facteur Cheval ("Mail Carrier Cheval") was a French mail carrier who spent 33 years building Le Palais idéal (the "Ideal Palace") in Hauterives, in southeastern France. It is regarded as an extraordinary example of naïve art architecture.

Origins 
Cheval was born in Charmes-sur-l'Herbasse to a poor farming family. He left school at age 13 to become a baker's apprentice, but eventually became a mail carrier.

In 1858, he married his first wife, Rosaline Revol. They had two sons, Victorin Joseph Fernand (1864) and Ferdinand Cyril (1867). Victorin died after only a year, in 1865. Rosaline herself died in 1873. Five years later, Cheval met and married Claire-Philomène Richaud. Her dowry included the land on which the Palais Idéal stands today. In 1878, she gave birth to their daughter, Alice-Marie-Philomène, who died in 1894 at the age of 15. Alice's death hit Cheval the hardest and she was the last child he would have. 18 years later, his son Cyril and second wife Claire died within two years of each other, in 1912 and 1914, respectively.

Palais idéal 

Cheval began building the Palais Idéal in 1879 when he was 43. He reported:

"I was walking very fast when my foot caught on something that sent me stumbling a few metres away, I wanted to know the cause. [Previously, in] a dream, I had built a palace, a castle or caves, I cannot express it well... I told no one about it for fear of being ridiculed and I felt ridiculous myself. 

"Then fifteen years later, when I had almost forgotten my dream, when I wasn't thinking of it at all, my foot reminded me of it. My foot tripped on a stone that almost made me fall. I wanted to know what it was... It was a stone of such a strange shape that I put it in my pocket to admire it at my leisure.

"The next day, I went back to the same place. I found more stones, even more beautiful, I gathered them together on the spot and was overcome with delight... It's a sandstone shaped by water and hardened by the power of time. It becomes as hard as pebbles. It represents a sculpture so strange that it is impossible for man to imitate, it represents any kind of animal, any kind of caricature.

"I said to myself: since Nature is willing to do the sculpture, I will do the masonry and the architecture."

For the next 33 years, Cheval picked up stones during his daily mail rounds and carried them home to build the Palais idéal. At first, he carried the stones in his pockets, then switched to a basket. Eventually, he used a wheelbarrow. He often worked at night, by the light of an oil lamp. He spent the first 20 years building the outer walls.

The palace materials mainly consist of stones (river washed), pebbles, porous tufa and fossils of different shapes and sizes. The decoration resembles aspects of both the Royal Pavilion in Brighton, England and Antoni Gaudí's Sagrada Família. Cheval did not travel and had even given himself the title of peasant, so even though some qualities of his work resemble those pieces of art, he had never seen them. 

Three giant stones, each with doll-like faces, standing about 10.5 high, serve not only as decoration but as a support system for the Barbary Tower, with a line of cement swans leading up to an spiral staircase. The three giant stones were named after Vercingétorix, Archimedes and Julius Caesar, the names of each hand-carved by Cheval into each individual figure.

The north facade exhibits a long path dotted with large openings to provide plentiful light leading into the heart of the palace itself. This facade is strikingly forest-like: walls are coated in moss and massive seaweed. The ceiling's swirling patterns of pebbles and shells outline the chandeliers. Upper walls are lined with horizontal bands that have animals carved into them, Egyptian style.

The east facade took the longest to build, 20 years. It includes the Temple of Nature, an Egyptian style temple-like structure supported by large, thick sandstone columns. It includes two waterfalls called the Source of Life and the Source of Wisdom.

The Palais is a mix of different styles, with inspirations from Christianity to Hinduism. Cheval bound the stones together with lime, mortar and cement.

The palace is sprinkled with short quotes and poems, hand-carved by Cheval himself. Some examples being "If you look for gold you will find it in elbow grease.", "The Pantheon of an obscure hero." "The work of one man", "Out of a dream I have brought forth the Queen of the World", "This is of art, and of energy", "The ecstasy of a beautiful dream and the prize of effort", "Dream of a peasant", "Temple of Life", and "Palace of the Imagination". Perhaps the most iconic phrase he inscribed on the wall reads "1879-1912 10,000 days, 93,000 hours, 33 years of struggle. Let those who think they can do better try."

Burial 

Cheval wanted to be buried in his palace. Because it is illegal in France, he spent eight more years building a mausoleum for himself in the Hauterives cemetery. He died on 19 August 1924, about a year after he had finished building it, and is buried there.

Recognition 
Just before his death, Cheval received recognition from figures including André Breton, Bernard Buffet, Jean Tinguely, Niki de Saint Phalle, Robert Doisneau, and Pablo Picasso. His work is commemorated in an essay by Anaïs Nin. In 1932, the German artist Max Ernst created a collage titled The Postman Cheval. The collage belongs to the Peggy Guggenheim Collection and is on display there. In 1958, Ado Kyrou produced Le Palais idéal, a short film about Cheval's palace.

After admiring Cheval's work, Picasso created a series of drawings telling a narrative, in a cartoon fashion, which is now recognized as Facteur Cheval sketchbook in 1937. Picasso drew him as a twisted, hybrid-like creature (or beast), carved with the initials of the French postal service (P.T.T) on his skin, dressed in typical postman's attire, holding masonry tools and a letter. The creature was standing in front of his creation. In the drawing, Picasso took a humorous route, sketching Cheval's body in the shape of a horse and his head that of a bird. Picasso did this in an effort to make a sort of pun about Cheval's name and career, given birds are messengers (as Cheval was a postman) and the meaning of Cheval is horse.

In 1969, André Malraux, the minister of Culture, declared the Palais a cultural landmark and had it officially protected. In 1986, Cheval was put on a French postage stamp.

In 2018 French director Nils Tavernier released the feature film  (English: Ideal Palace) about Cheval's life and work, with Jacques Gamblin starring as Cheval.

In 2018 Will Varley included the song "The Postman" about Cheval and the Palais Idéal on his studio album Spirit of Minnie.

Gallery

See also

References

External links 

 Postman Cheval's website in English and French
 Le Palais Idéal du Facteur Cheval (requires Flash).
 Expo.htm at perso.wanadoo.fr" Expo Coco Peintre du Facteur Cheval-1987 Hauterives France
 Hauterives and Palais Idéal Photogallery
 Album Mon Cheval, a French blog's photogallery.

1836 births
1924 deaths
19th-century French architects
Mail carriers
Outsider artists
People from Drôme
Visionary environments